Heberto A. Blanco (October 7, 1920 – October 12, 2011) was a Cuban second baseman in the Negro leagues and Mexican League.

A native of Bayamo, Cuba, Blanco was the younger brother of fellow-Negro leaguer Carlos Blanco. He made his Negro leagues debut in 1941 with the New York Cubans, and played for New York again in 1942, when he was selected to represent the club in the East–West All-Star Game. Blanco went on to play many seasons in the Mexican League, and played minor league baseball for the Roswell Rockets in 1956. He died in Havana, Cuba in 2011 at age 91.

References

External links
 and Baseball-Reference Black Baseball and Mexican League stats and Seamheads 

1920 births
2011 deaths
New York Cubans players
Cuban baseball players
Baseball second basemen
People from Bayamo
Cuban expatriates in the United States
Cuban expatriates in Mexico